Lamoignon is the name of a French noble family:

 Famille de Lamoignon (French article, use translate option to view in English)
Guillaume de Lamoignon (1617–1677), lawyer
Nicolas de Lamoignon (1648–1724), Guillaume's second son, public official
Chrétien François de Lamoignon de Basville (1735–1789)
Guillaume-Chrétien de Lamoignon de Malesherbes (1721–1794), official